Men in black, in American popular culture and in UFO conspiracy theories, are men dressed in black suits who claim to be government agents who harass or threaten UFO witnesses to keep them quiet about what they have seen.

Men in Black may also refer to:

Arts and entertainment
Men in Black (1934 film), a Three Stooges short film
The Men in Black (comics), comic book series
Men in Black (franchise), based on The Men in Black comics
Men in Black (1997 film), the 1997 comic science fiction film, based on the comic series
Men in Black: The Album, the soundtrack album from the 1997 film
"Men in Black" (song), a song by Will Smith and Coko
Men in Black: The Series, an animated series based on the 1997 film
Men in Black II, the 2002 sequel to the 1997 film
Men in Black 3, the third film in the series (2012)
Men in Black: International, the fourth film in the series (2019)
The Gospel According to the Meninblack, a 1981 concept album by The Stranglers
 "Men in Black", a song on Frank Black's 1996 album The Cult of Ray
 Men in Black (1995), a novel by Scott Spencer

Fictional characters
 Men in Black (The X-Files), characters from the TV show The X-Files

See also

 
 Men in White (disambiguation)
 Man in Black (disambiguation)
 MIB (disambiguation)